is a Japanese former figure skater. He is a two season competitor on the Junior Grand Prix circuit and placed 14th at the 2006 Junior Grand Prix Norway.

Competitive highlights

External links
 
https://www.jsfresults.com/

1991 births
People from Meguro
Japanese male single skaters
Sportspeople from Tokyo
Living people
Competitors at the 2011 Winter Universiade